The Database on Rare, Endangered and Threatened plants of Kerala is a red list compiled by The Kerala Forest Research Institute (KFRI), Peechi, Kerala, with information from various institutions and scientists. It is a list of plants that are presently threatened  present in Kerala.

See also
 List of endemic and threatened plants of India

References

Flora of Kerala
.